The Trials of Darksmoke is a 2013 fantasy-adventure fan film based upon Mattel's Masters of the Universe franchise. It is the third and final film in a trilogy that includes The Wizard of Stone Mountain and The Fountain of Life. The film was directed by John F. Carroll during the Winter and Spring of 2012 around Austin, Texas and the Texas Hill Country.

The film ties together several plots that have run throughout the trilogy. The Wizard, Malik, He-Man, She-Ra and their friends journey throughout Eternia attempting to stop the evil Skeletor. The film was set to debut at Grayskull Con 2013 in Germany in September 2013, followed by Screenings at Power-Con 2013 in Los Angeles and the Alamo Drafthouse in Austin, Texas. However, due to longer than expected post-production, the film was delayed until 2014. The film will be free to view online and will begin streaming sometime in late 2014.

Plot
The evil Skeletor has released an unspeakable demonic power and with it, he will conquer Castle Grayskull and the rest of the universe!  He-Man and She-Ra work against the odds to stop Skeletor while the wizard Malik claims an ancient power bestowed by the great dragon Granamyr. But will the cost be too great?

Cast
John F. Carroll as Malik
David McCullars as He-Man
Chris Romani as Evil-Lyn
Javier Smith as Keldor, Zodak
Bethany Harbaugh as Teela
Bridget Farias as Kareen
Richard Dodwell as Kyros
Joseph Fotinos as King Randor
Bob Swaffar as King Miro
Emily Hampton as Princess Adora, She-Ra
Parker Danks as Chad
Robert Berry as Grandfather
Juli Dearrington as The Sorceress
Andrew Brett as Skeletor
Elisabeth Raine as Rayna
Laura Cannon as Myrna
Ben Scott as Man-At-Arms
Taylor Basinger as Giaus
Björn Korthof as Prince Adam
Johnny Bilson as Tri-Klops
Peggy Schott as Queen Angella
Briony Zakes as Frosta
Lee Wilson as King Grayskull
Darwin Miller as Eldor
Kenneth C. Liverman as King Ragnar
Dean Stefan as Elder in Council of Elders
Dan Eardley as Elder in Council of Elders
Danielle Gelehrter as Elder in Council of Elders
Rob Lamb as Elder in Council of Elders
Jukka Issakainen as Elder in Council of Elders
Jon Kallis as Elder in Council of Elders
Joshua Van Pelt as Elder in Council of Elders
James Eatock as Elder in Council of Elders

Production
The Trials of Darksmoke and The Fountain of Life were shot simultaneously during the winter and spring of 2012. With pick-up shots scheduled for Winter 2013. The films were shot digitally, using two DSLR cameras—A Canon T2i and a Nikon D7000. A riverbed in Walnut Creek Park, a location that had been used in the previous films in the series, collapsed after a rainstorm in April 2012 and was repurposed for other set locations.

Reception
The film is currently in post-production and will premiere in the Autumn of 2013.

Sequels
The Trials of Darksmoke is part of a trilogy that includes The Wizard of Stone Mountain and The Fountain of Life. The Trials of Darksmoke is the third and final film in the trilogy.

References

External links
 
The Trials of Darksmoke Facebook Page
Internet Movie Database

Films shot in Austin, Texas
English-language films
Fan films